Futsal Association of India (FAI) is the governing body of state-level futsal league and Asian Premier Futsal Championship in India. 

FAI has been developing futsal through various District, State and National Championships. FAI organised its 1st Youth Futsal Championship in 2011.  

FAI is affiliated with Asociación Mundial de Fútbol de Salón (AMF) since 2011, and was a founding member of the Confederation of Asian Futsal (CAFS).

See also
Football in India
AMF Futsal World Cup
AFC Futsal Asian Cup
AFC Futsal Club Championship
FIFA Futsal World Cup
AIFF Futsal Club Championship
Minifootball
Five-a-side football
Indoor soccer

References

External links
Futsal in India

Sports governing bodies in India
Futsal in India
2007 establishments in Maharashtra
Football governing bodies in India
Sports organizations established in 2007
Organisations based in Mumbai